Hu Dongmei (born 23 December 1971 in Zhangye, Gansu) is a Chinese sprint canoer who competed in the mid-1990s. At the 1996 Summer Olympics in Atlanta, she was eliminated in the semifinals of the K-2 500 m event.

References

External links
 
 

1971 births
Living people
Chinese female canoeists
Olympic canoeists of China
Canoeists at the 1996 Summer Olympics
Asian Games medalists in canoeing
Asian Games gold medalists for China
Canoeists at the 1994 Asian Games
Medalists at the 1994 Asian Games
People from Zhangye
Sportspeople from Gansu